An Dae-hyun (Hangul: 안대현, Hanja: 安大鉉; born October 28, 1962 in Goesan, Chungcheongbuk-do) is a retired South Korean Greco-Roman wrestler.

He received a bronze medal at the 1988 Summer Olympics in Seoul. He won a silver medal in the Greco-Roman division at the 1993 Peer Gynt cup in Norway.

References

External links

1962 births
Living people
South Korean wrestlers
Olympic wrestlers of South Korea
Wrestlers at the 1988 Summer Olympics
South Korean male sport wrestlers
Olympic bronze medalists for South Korea
Olympic medalists in wrestling
Asian Games medalists in wrestling
Wrestlers at the 1986 Asian Games
People from Goesan County
Medalists at the 1988 Summer Olympics
Medalists at the 1986 Asian Games
Asian Games silver medalists for South Korea
Sportspeople from North Chungcheong Province
20th-century South Korean people
21st-century South Korean people